Patrick Connor (6 August 1926 – 22 July 2008) was a British actor. His stage work included the original West End production of Alfie in 1963. He was married to the actress and writer Joyce Marlow.

Filmography

References

External links

1926 births
2008 deaths
People from Margate
British male stage actors
British male film actors
British male television actors